Urs Schönenberger (born 21 February 1959) is a Swiss football manager and former player.

References

1959 births
Living people
Swiss men's footballers
FC Zürich players
AC Bellinzona players
FC Luzern players
SC Kriens players
FC Baden players
Swiss Super League players
Swiss football managers
FC Winterthur managers
SC Kriens managers
FC Luzern managers
FC Thun managers
FC Aarau managers
SC Young Fellows Juventus managers
FC Wohlen managers
Association football defenders
Footballers from Zürich